Seth Justman (born January 27, 1951) is the keyboard player for the U.S. rock band, The J. Geils Band.

Biography
Justman was born in Washington, D.C., grew up in Atlantic City, and is Jewish.

He co-wrote many of the band's songs with singer Peter Wolf, and took sole songwriting credits for the band's biggest international hit, "Centerfold" (number 1 for six weeks on the Billboard Hot 100).

Seth is the brother of Paul Justman, director of the 2002 movie, Standing in the Shadows of Motown. Paul and Seth shared songwriting credits for most of the songs on the band's final album, You're Gettin' Even While I'm Gettin' Odd. Justman also became the band's main vocalist following Wolf's departure until the band's first break-up in 1985.

In 1986, Justman produced and partly co-wrote Rockbird, the second solo album by Debbie Harry.

References

External links
 Geils Files
Fan site for Justman

1951 births
Living people
American male singers
American male songwriters
American rock keyboardists
American male organists
Jewish American musicians
Musicians from Atlantic City, New Jersey
Musicians from Washington, D.C.
Record producers from Washington, D.C.
Songwriters from Washington, D.C.
The J. Geils Band members
20th-century American male musicians
21st-century American keyboardists
21st-century organists
21st-century American male musicians
20th-century American keyboardists
21st-century American Jews